The Airtrike Eagle 5 is a German ultralight trike, that was designed and produced by Airtrike of Berlin. When it was in production the aircraft was supplied as a complete ready-to-fly-aircraft.

The manufacturer entered liquidation on 1 January 2017.

Design and development
It features a cable-braced hang glider-style high-wing, weight-shift controls, a two-seats-in-tandem open cockpit, tricycle landing gear with wheel pants and a single engine in pusher configuration.

The aircraft is made from bolted-together aluminum tubing, with its fuselage made predominately from composites and with its double surface wing covered in Dacron sailcloth. Its  span Hazard 12S wing is attached by lift struts to its "A" frame weight-shift control bar. The standard powerplant is an air-cooled, four-stroke,  BMW motorcycle engine. Optional powerplants include the four cylinder, air and liquid-cooled, four-stroke, dual-ignition  Rotax 912 engine and the in-house designed Airtrike 850ti  engine.

A number of different wings can be fitted to the basic carriage, including the strut-braced Hazard 12S and several Aeros wings.

Specifications (Eagle 5)

References

External links

2000s German sport aircraft
2000s German ultralight aircraft
Single-engined pusher aircraft
Ultralight trikes